Gayatri Jayaraman is an Indian actress. She played the role of Devi Adishakti in Shree Ganesh & has appeared predominantly in Tamil, Kannada, Telugu and Malayalam language films.

Early life
Gayatri Jayaraman was educated at Adarsh Vidyalaya and the Church Park in Chennai. She was raised in Shahabad near Gulbarga until she was four years old, before her family headed to Madras. She spent a year in Bangalore.Gayatri at first wished to pursue a career in medicine  and despite gaining 94% in board exams, she did not get a medical seat, and hence began reading a B.Sc. in life science at IGNOU. Gayatri balanced her time between modelling and education and thus also went on to study physiotherapy at SRM College in Chennai. About her decision to simultaneously pursue qualifications she revealed that "the average life of an actress on screen is maximum four years" and that "she can always return to physiotherapy once my career as an actress is over".

She took up her first modelling assignments for Nalli Silks, followed by Kumaran Silks, Pothys and Chennai Silks while also participating in the beauty pageants, winning the Miss Tamil Nadu title in October 1997 and Miss South India title in 1998. She entered the final stages of Femina Miss India 2000, after being selected among the 26 finalists from 8000 entries and made it through to the final 5, eventually finishing fourth. She has also been a video jockey on television, having appeared for Fanta "Ilamai Pudhumai" on Sun TV and "Telephone Manipol" on Vijay TV.

Career
Gayathri began her career as an actress with director K. Balachander's tele-serial Azhukku Veshti and rejected offers from prominent directors such as Arjun before deciding to make her debut by featuring in Nagabharana's Neela. Neela, a Kannada film about a tribal singer with cancer. It was selected as one of the thirty-two Indian films to feature at the International Film Festival of India. Gayatri won a Cinema Express Award for her performance, with a critic describing it as a "matured performance gives an impression of her being an experienced actress". She made her Tamil film debut after being approached by producer KRG to feature in his  Manadhai Thirudivittai opposite Prabhu Deva. Gayatri, post-release, remarked that her role in the film was changed, with Kausalya playing the role that she had signed on to portray. The film became a commercial failure, although her appearance in the song "Manjakattu Mynaa" got her noticed.

Her Telugu film debut was with Srikanth in Aaduthu Paaduthu, before she also went on to feature in a supporting role in Shree alongside Suriya, with Gayatri revealing that her role was chopped by the editors in post-production. She featured in another small role in Vaseegara alongside Vijay and Sneha, before going on to feature in a series of unsuccessful Kannada and Malayalam films.

She retired from films after her marriage and is now a certified scuba diving instructor in the Andaman Islands and briefly returned to compere the Chennai Super Kings Cheer Leaders talent show on Vijay TV in 2009. She also notably, anchored the show Super Kudumbam on Sun TV in early 2013.

Personal life
In May 2007 she married Samit Sawhny, an Indian entrepreneur and author, in the Andaman Islands in a small and private wedding function.

Filmography

Television
Serials

Shows

Web Series

References

External links

Indian film actresses
Living people
Indian beauty pageant winners
Female models from Mumbai
21st-century Indian actresses
Actresses from Mumbai
Actresses in Tamil cinema
Actresses in Kannada cinema
Actresses in Malayalam cinema
Actresses in Telugu cinema
Actresses in Hindi cinema
Actresses in Tamil television
Actresses in Hindi television
Year of birth missing (living people)